The Journal of the Royal Society Interface is a monthly peer-reviewed scientific journal covering the interface between the life sciences and the physical sciences, including chemistry, engineering, materials science, mathematics, and physics. The editor-in-chief is Richard Cogdell (University of Glasgow). The journal was established in 2004 and is published by the Royal Society.

Abstracting and indexing
The journal is abstracted and indexed in the Chemical Abstracts Service, Science Citation Index, BIOSIS Previews, Current Contents/Life Sciences, The Zoological Record, Scopus, and Index Medicus/MEDLINE/PubMed. According to the Journal Citation Reports, the journal has a 2020 impact factor of 4.118.

References

External links

 

Hybrid open access journals
Publications established in 2004
English-language journals
Monthly journals
Multidisciplinary scientific journals
2004 establishments in the United Kingdom
Royal Society academic journals